Diogo Filipe Monteiro Pinto Leite (born 23 January 1999) is a Portuguese professional footballer who plays as a centre-back for Bundesliga club Union Berlin, on loan from Primeira Liga club Porto.

Club career
Born in Porto, Leite joined FC Porto's youth academy at the age of 9. He made his professional debut with the reserve team on 27 August 2017, playing the entire 1–0 home win against C.D. Santa Clara for the LigaPro.

In late July 2018, due to several injuries to the back sector, first-team manager Sérgio Conceição called Leite for the upcoming Supertaça Cândido de Oliveira match against C.D. Aves; he partnered Felipe in that match, a 3–1 victory in Aveiro. Shortly before that event, he had renewed his contract until 2023.

Leite's maiden appearance in the Primeira Liga took place on 11 August 2018 in the season opener, and he again played the entire 5–0 home defeat of G.D. Chaves. He scored his first goal in the competition the following weekend, helping to a 3–2 victory at Belenenses SAD; shortly after, however, he returned to the reserves.

On 31 August 2021, Leite was loaned to S.C. Braga for one year. He made 34 competitive appearances during his spell at the Estádio Municipal de Braga, but only five in the last three months.

In July 2022, still owned by Porto, Leite joined 1. FC Union Berlin with a buying option.

International career
Leite won his first cap for Portugal at under-21 level at the age of only 19, coming on as a second-half substitute in a 3–2 friendly win over Italy. He was later used as a starter by coach Rui Jorge in both legs of the 2019 UEFA European Championship play-offs, lost to Poland 3–1 on aggregate.

In October 2022, Leite was named in a preliminary 55-man squad for the 2022 FIFA World Cup in Qatar.

Career statistics

Club

Honours
Porto Youth
UEFA Youth League: 2018–19

Porto
Primeira Liga: 2019–20
Taça de Portugal: 2019–20
Supertaça Cândido de Oliveira: 2018, 2020

Portugal
UEFA European Under-17 Championship: 2016

Individual
UEFA European Under-17 Championship Team of the Tournament: 2016
Primeira Liga Defender of the Month: August 2018

References

External links

1999 births
Living people
Portuguese footballers
Footballers from Porto
Association football defenders
Primeira Liga players
Liga Portugal 2 players
Padroense F.C. players
FC Porto B players
FC Porto players
S.C. Braga players
Bundesliga players
1. FC Union Berlin players
Portugal youth international footballers
Portugal under-21 international footballers
Portuguese expatriate footballers
Expatriate footballers in Germany
Portuguese expatriate sportspeople in Germany